Michael Chang defeated Paul Haarhuis in the final, 7–5, 6–1, 6–1 to win the men's singles tennis title at the 1996 Indian Wells Masters.

Pete Sampras was the two-time defending champion, but lost in the quarterfinals to Haarhuis.

Seeds
The top eight seeds received a bye to the second round.

Draw

Finals

Top half

Section 1

Section 2

Bottom half

Section 3

Section 4

References
 1996 Newsweek Champions Cup Draw

Singles
1996 Newsweek Champions Cup and the State Farm Evert Cup